Tang-e Gurdalu-ye Dishmuk (also Romanized as Tang-e Gūrdālū-ye Dīshmūk) is a village in Bahmayi-ye Sarhadi-ye Sharqi Rural District, Dishmok District, Kohgiluyeh County, Kohgiluyeh and Boyer-Ahmad Province, Iran. At the 2006 census, its population was 126, in 22 families.

References 

Populated places in Kohgiluyeh County